The 2001 Munster Senior Hurling Championship Final was a hurling match played on 1 July 2001 at Páirc Uí Chaoimh, Cork, County Cork. It was contested by Tipperary and Limerick. Tipperary claimed their first Munster Championship of the decade, beating Limerick on a scoreline of 2–16 to 1–17, a 2-point winning margin.
Overall, this was Tipperary's thirty sixth Munster Senior Hurling Championship title.
Tipperay had defeated Clare in the semi-final by 0–15 to 0–14 to reach the final, while Limerick had defeated Cork by 1–16 to 1–15 in the quarter final and Waterford by 4–11 to 2–14 in the semi-final to reach the final.
The match was screened live by RTÉ as part of The Sunday Game programme.

Match details

References

External links
 Highlights of the Match

See also
 Limerick–Tipperary hurling rivalry

Munster
Munster Senior Hurling Championship Finals
Hurling in County Limerick
Tipperary GAA matches